The 1869 Wisconsin gubernatorial election was held on November 2, 1869. Incumbent Republican Party Governor Lucius Fairchild won re-election with over 53% of the vote, defeating Democratic candidate Charles D. Robinson.

Democratic Party
Charles D. Robinson was a businessman and newspaper publisher and had been the 3rd Secretary of State of Wisconsin.  Prior to his nomination for Governor, Robinson had served in the Wisconsin State Assembly for one term, in 1850, had served as a Quartermaster with the Union Army during the American Civil War, and served one term as Mayor of Green Bay, Wisconsin, in 1866.  He was the creator, writer, and publisher of the Democratic paper The Green Bay Advocate since 1846.

Other candidates
 Nicholas D. Fratt, of Racine, Wisconsin, was a respected farmer and businessman who had served one term in the Wisconsin State Senate. He was founder and president of the Racine County Bank.
 David W. Jones, of Iowa County, Wisconsin, had been the 5th Secretary of State of Wisconsin.

Republican Party
Lucius Fairchild was the incumbent Governor of Wisconsin, having been elected in the 1865 election and re-elected in 1867.  Prior to his election as Governor, he was Wisconsin Secretary of State for one term.  Fairchild had also been a Union Army officer in the American Civil War, having served as a colonel in the famous Iron Brigade when they participated in fierce fighting at Gettysburg.  Fairchild lost an arm due to wounds sustained at Gettysburg, and was later awarded an honorary promotion to brigadier general.

Results

| colspan="6" style="text-align:center;background-color: #e9e9e9;"| General Election, November 2, 1869

References

1869
Wisconsin
1869 Wisconsin elections